Peter Verhoyen is a flautist and piccolo player.

Biography 
Peter Verhoyen is principal piccolo of the Antwerp Symphony Orchestra, co-founder of the chamber music ensemble Arco Baleno, professor of piccolo at the Royal Conservatoire Antwerp, senior lecturer piccolo at the Universität für Musik und darstellende Kunst Graz and organizer of the International Flute Seminar Bruges.

Piccolo specialist, Verhoyen has commissioned and premiered a large number of new works for his instrument, notably including 4 piccolo concerti by Levente Gyöngyösi, Robert Groslot, Erik Desimpelaere and Bart Watté. He also realised a of a series of recordings in which the piccolo is the central instrument. At the Royal Conservatoire Antwerp, Peter Verhoyen developed the first European piccolo Masters program.

For his dedication to contemporary Flemish music, Peter has been awarded the Fuga Trofee from the Union of Belgian composers in 2017.

Peter Verhoyen has worked with a large number of other performers and orchestras, including Collegium Instrumentale Brugense (conducted by Patrick Peire) and the orchestra Il Novecento (conducted by Robert Groslot).

Bibliography
 Lexicon van de Muziek in West-Vlaanderen, part 4 (Brugge, 2003), ISBN 90-72390-26-1

as author

Discography (selection)

 Piccolo concerti. With Ataneres ensemble. EtCetera KTC 1749 (2022)
 Piccolo sonatas. With Stefan De Schepper, piano. EtCetera KTC 1736 (2021)
 Zigeunerweisen. With Ilonka Kolthof, Anke Lauwers, Thomas Fabry (piccolo), Stefan de Schepper (piano) and Ann-Sofie Verhoyen (harp). Etcetera KTC 1701 (2020)
 The Birds. Original works for piccolo and piano. With Stefan De Schepper, piano. Codaex CX 4026 (2020)
 Mighty Metamorphoses. 21th-century repertoire for piccolo and flute. With Stefan De Schepper (piano), and Aldo Baerten (flute). EtCetera KTC 1668 (2019)
 W.A.Mozart Flute Quartets. With Arco Baleno Chamber Music Group. Codaex CX 4010 (2015)
 Best of both worlds. Marc Matthys European Quartet with Ali Ryerson and Peter Verhoyen. Alley Cats PMP 5411499510225 (2014)
 Dirk Brossé - Earth tones. Chamber music for ensemble Arco Baleno and ethnic instruments. Codaex CX4025 (2009)
 Britannia. British chamber music for flute/piccolo, strings and harpsichord. With Arco Baleno Chamber Music Group. EtCetera KTC 1372 (2008)
 Piccolo Tunes. With Stefan De Schepper, piano. EtCetera KTC 1296 (2006)
 Debussy/Brewaeys – Preludes for symphony orchestra. With Royal Flemish Philharmonic. Talent DOM 381004 (2005)
 Antonio Vivaldi. String concertos – Flute concerto 'Il Gardellino' – Piccolo concerti. With Arco Baleno Chamber Music Group. EtCetera KTC 1278 (2004)
 Fantasia … sul linguaggio perduto: compositions for flute and string trio. With Arco Baleno Chamber Music Group. Radio 3 R397003 (1996)

External links
 Peter Verhoyen official website
 Peter Verhoyen's official YouTube channel
 Peter Verhoyen at the International Piccolo Flute Academy

References

Belgian classical flautists
Flemish musicians
Living people
Year of birth missing (living people)
Belgian music educators
Place of birth missing (living people)